The 1996 Queensland Cup season was the 1st season of Queensland's premier statewide competition. It had been formed after the Winfield State League was closed after the end of the 1995 Season. It was subsequently superseded by the Queensland Cup.
At this time it was considered as the second highest league, directly under the Brisbane Rugby League. It would run under the BRL until 1998 when it would become the highest rugby league competition in the state.

Teams 
The inaugural Queensland Cup season featured 16 teams, 12 from south east Queensland, two from north Queensland and one each from central Queensland and Papua New Guinea.

Regular season 
The inaugural Queensland Cup consisted of 16 teams and ran for 15 regular season rounds (which included two split rounds) with a top 6 finals system.

Ladder 

 1Awarded one point due to game being cancelled.

Finals series

Grand Final 

The inaugural Queensland Cup Grand Final featured minor premiers, the Toowoomba Clydesdales, and the second placed Redcliffe Dolphins, in what would be the fourth meeting between the two sides in 1996. The first encounter was in Round 13, with Redcliffe defeating Toowoomba 18-8 to secure the two competition points. The sides then met twice in the final series, with both matches being low-scoring, defensive battles. In the qualifying final, the Clydesdales recorded a narrow 12-10 win over the Dolphins, while two weeks later Redcliffe held on for a 6-0 victory to progress to the Grand Final.

First half 
Toowoomba second-rower Scott Kuhnemann recorded the only points in the first half, kicking a penalty goal in the 21st minute. This came after Redcliffe captain Ian Graham and Toowoomba's Paul Sutton were both sin binned for fighting.

Second half 
The first try of the final was eventually scored by Clydesdales' interchange player Shaun Lawson, who dummied and stepped through the Dolphins' defence to score under the posts. Redcliffe then hit back through centre Mark Shipway, who received the ball 35 metres out from the try line and sprinted around the Toowoomba defence to get his side back into the contest.

Redcliffe were then denied twice in the dying minutes by the Clydesdales' defence. Halfback Peter Robinson was stopped just before the line by Toowoomba fullback Kyle Warren, who knocked himself unconscious in the process, while Cameron Hurren had the ball knocked out of his arms, just moments later, as he went over the try line. As of 2019, the 8–6 scoreline is still the lowest ever in a Queensland Cup Grand Final.

Player statistics 
The following statistics are correct as of the conclusion of Round 15.

Leading try scorers

Leading point scorers

End-of-season awards 
 Courier Mail Medal: Alan Wieland ( Wests Panthers)
 Rookie of the Year: Brendan Liston ( Easts Tigers)

See also 

 Brisbane Rugby League
 Queensland Cup
 Queensland Rugby League
 Winfield State League

References 

1996 in Australian rugby league
Queensland Cup
1996 in Papua New Guinean sport